Caribbean Jazz Project was a Latin jazz band founded in 1993. The original group featured Dave Samuels, Paquito D'Rivera, and Andy Narell. After their second album, D'Rivera and Narell left the group, although both returned as guest stars. Under Samuels' leadership, the group explored different genres of latin jazz with a changing membership and numerous guest artists. The band released nine albums under the Caribbean Jazz Project name and one as the featured backing band for jazz singer Diane Schuur. The final album with Samuels, Afro Bop Alliance, featured the Maryland-based Afro Bop Alliance Big Band led by drummer Joe McCarthy and won the 2008 Latin Grammy Award for Best Latin Jazz Album.  McCarthy's latin jazz big band continues to record under its own name, and Samuels retains the group's name.

Discography
 The Caribbean Jazz Project (Heads Up, 1995)
 Island Stories with Paquito D'Rivera (Heads Up, 1997)
 New Horizons (Concord Picante, 2000)
 Paraiso with Dave Samuels, Dave Valentin, Steve Khan (Concord, 2001)
 The Gathering   (Concord Picante, 2002)
 Birds of a Feather with Dave Samuels (Concord Picante, 2003)
 Schuur Fire, Diane Schuur with Caribbean Jazz Project (Concord Picante 2005)
 Here and Now: Live in Concert (Concord 2005)
 Mosaic with Dave Samuels (Concord Picante, 2006)
 Afro Bop Alliance with Dave Samuels (Heads Up, 2008)

Members
Sources:
 Oscar Feldman - alto and soprano saxophone
 Andy Axelrad – alto saxophone
 John Benitez – bass
 Randy Brecker – trumpet
 Café – percussion
 Caridad Canelon – backing vocals
 Oscar Castro-Neves – guitar
 Luis Conte – congas, bongos, timbales, percussion
 Nick Cooper – trumpet
 Dan Drew – trombone
 Dario Eskenazi – piano
 Richie Flores – congas, bongos, shakere
 Luis Hernandez – tenor saxophone
 Conrad Herwig – trombone
 Rob Holmes – baritone saxophone
 Christian Howes – violin
 Steve Khan – guitar
 Boris Kozlov – bass
 Romero Lubambo – guitar
 Alain Mallet – piano, organ
 Joe McCarthy – drums
 Jim McFalls – trombone
 Mark Morgan – trombone
 Max Murray – bass
 Andy Narell – steel pans
 Vince Norman – tenor saxophone
 Ben Patterson – trombone
 Dafnis Prieto – timbales, drums
 Luisito Quintero – timbales, percussion
 Paquito D'Rivera – alto saxophone, clarinet
 Ruben Rodriguez – bass
 Poncho Sanchez – congas
 Dave Samuels – marimba, vibraphone
 Pernell Saturnino – congas, percussion
 Oscar Stagnaro – bass
 Tim Stanley – trumpet
 Diego Urcola – trumpet, flugelhorn
 Dave Valentin – flute
 Ray Vega – flugelhorn, trumpet
 Robert Vilera – timbales, percussion
 Mark Walker – drums
 Chris Walter – trumpet
 Steve Williams – alto saxophone
 Alon Yavnai – piano

References

Afro-Cuban jazz ensembles
Latin jazz ensembles
Latin Grammy Award winners
Grammy Award winners
American jazz ensembles